Naisyin Wang is a Taiwanese statistician who works as a professor of statistics at the University of Michigan. She was president of the International Chinese Statistical Association in 2010.

Education and career
Wang did her undergraduate studies in mathematics at National Tsing Hua University, graduating in 1986. After earning a master's degree in statistics from Ohio State University in 1987, she completed her doctorate from Cornell University in 1992, under the supervision of David Ruppert. She worked as a faculty member at Texas A&M University from 1992 until 2009, when she moved to Michigan.

Awards and honors
She is a fellow of the American Association for the Advancement of Science, the American Statistical Association, and the Institute of Mathematical Statistics, and an elected member of the International Statistical Institute.

References

External links
Home page

Year of birth missing (living people)
Living people
American statisticians
Taiwanese statisticians
Women statisticians
National Tsing Hua University alumni
Ohio State University Graduate School alumni
Texas A&M University faculty
University of Michigan faculty
Fellows of the American Association for the Advancement of Science
Fellows of the American Statistical Association
Fellows of the Institute of Mathematical Statistics
Elected Members of the International Statistical Institute
Cornell University alumni